Pedro Antonio González González (born 1965 in Sutamarchán, Boyacá, Colombia) is a Colombian humorist, journalist and actor also known as Don Jediondo (a play on the word hediondo, meaning stinky or pungent).

Career
He got his start in the mid-1990s appearing in Caracol Televisión's Sábados Felices. From there, he went on to direct No me lo cambie, a program produced by DFL Televisión and aired on Canal A. More recently, he has appeared on Caracol's Día a Día and once more on Sábados Felices.

In 2007, he appeared in the movie Muertos del sustos with Juan Ricardo Lozano (Alerta) and Teresa Gutiérrez.

He is also a partner in the Don Jediondo restaurant chain (named for his principal character), which has locations in the country's major cities.

Characters
 Don Jediondo
 Doctora Frabia (Flavia Dos Santos)
 Amparito
 Papá Paramillo (Jaime Jaramillo)
 Modestor Morales- (a parody of Néstor Morales)
 La W-Ulio (caricature of Julio Sánchez Cristo)
 Jorge Balón (caricature of Jorge Barón)
 Don Emeterio

References

External links
 Official website

Living people
1965 births
Colombian male comedians
Colombian male film actors
Colombian male television actors
People from Boyacá Department